Munch/Stenersen (Norwegian: Munchmuseet) is a new building in Bjørvika, Oslo completed in 2020. The building was designed by Juan Herreros (Abalos & Herreros).
There has been a lot of conflict around the building, considering both its design, functionality and height (14 floors/46 meters). 
The building lies next to the Oslo Opera building together with the upcoming Oslo Public Library complexes. The building is called "Lambda" by the architect/designer.

References 

Buildings and structures in Oslo
Fjord City